Little Waves is a Canadian short drama film, written and directed by Ariane Louis-Seize and released in 2018. The film centres on a young girl who experiences a sexual awakening after her cousin brings a new boyfriend to a family gathering for the first time.

The film was named to the Toronto International Film Festival's annual year-end Canada's Top Ten list for 2018.

References

External links

2018 films
2018 short films
Films directed by Ariane Louis-Seize
2018 drama films
French-language Canadian films
Canadian drama short films
2010s Canadian films